Richard Lindley (25 April 1936 – 6 November 2019) was a British television journalist.

Biography
Lindley was born in Winchester, Hampshire, on 25 April 1936. He was educated at Bedford School and Queens' College, Cambridge, and is mentioned in The Peerage.

Lindley's television career began in 1962. He joined ITN, working as a war reporter in Africa, Asia and in the Middle East. In 1973, he moved from news to current affairs, joining the BBC's flagship Panorama programme. He remained with Panorama for fifteen years before being appointed as a television regulator at the Independent Broadcasting Authority, forerunner of Ofcom, regulating the accuracy and impartiality of ITV news and current affairs. Returning to programme-making, he became a reporter and presenter for ITV's This Week. He subsequently rejoined ITN to present its World News and make special reports for News at Ten. He was latterly lead governor for Royal Free Hospital.

Lindley was married to the broadcaster Carole Stone. He published two books about the history of British broadcasting, including one on BBC Panorama and another on the News from ITN.

Lindley died on 6 November 2019. He died at home of heart disease after having been run over by a lorry when crossing the road and suffering multiple injuries. He had lived with early-onset Alzheimer's disease in his final three years.

References

External links

Unhappy returns for ITN
Decline and fall

1936 births
Alumni of Queens' College, Cambridge
ITN newsreaders and journalists
Panorama (British TV programme)
People educated at Bedford School
2019 deaths